Manor Lakes is a suburb in Melbourne, Victoria, Australia,  south-west of Melbourne's Central Business District, located within the City of Wyndham local government area. Manor Lakes recorded a population of 12,675 in the 2021 census.

The suburb was part of Wyndham Vale until April 2016, when it was officially gazetted as its own suburb.

Education

Below are some government and non-government, primary and secondary schools in Manor Lakes and nearby in Wyndham Vale:

 Iramoo Primary School
 Riverbend Primary School
 Wyndham Central College
 Wyndham Christian College
 Wyndham Vale Primary School
 Wyndham Vale South Primary School
 Manor Lakes P-12 College

References

Suburbs of Melbourne
Suburbs of the City of Wyndham